Paya is a town and municipality in the La Libertad Province, part of the Colombian department of Boyacá. Paya limits Pisba, Labranzagrande of Boyacá and Támara, Nunchía and Yopal (Casanare).

Etymology 
Paya in Chibcha means "People of hope".

History 
Before the Spanish conquest in the 1530s, Paya was inhabited by the Muisca, organized in their loose Muisca Confederation.

Modern Paya was founded on September 14, 1600.

Economy 
The majority of the economy of Paya comes from horticulture (47%). Other areas of income are livestock farming (37%) and agriculture (16%).

References 

Municipalities of Boyacá Department
Populated places established in 1600
1600 establishments in the Spanish Empire
Muisca Confederation
Muysccubun